Green Magic is a 1953 Italian documentary film directed by Gian Gaspare Napolitano.

Cast
 Carlos Montalbán as narrator, US version (voice)
 Bret Morrison as narrator, US version (voice)
 Leonardo Bonzi as himself (Expedition Member)
 Gian Gaspare Napolitano as himself (Expedition Member)
 Mario Craveri as himself (Expedition Member)
 Giovanni Raffaldi as himself (Expedition Member)
 Jose Docarmo as himself (Pilot)

Awards
Won
 3rd Berlin International Film Festival: Silver Bear

Nominated
 1953 Cannes Film Festival: Palme d'Or

References

External links

1953 films
1953 documentary films
1950s Italian-language films
Italian documentary films
Films directed by Gian Gaspare Napolitano
20th Century Fox films
1950s Italian films